The Trace Leads to the Silver Lake is a 1990 East German animated puppetoon Western film directed by Günter Rätz. It tells the story of how Old Shatterhand, with the help of Winnetou, races against bandits in search of a treasure. The film is based on the novel The Treasure of Silver Lake by Karl May. It was released on 19 January 1990. It won the 1991  for best animated film.

Cast (voices)
 Gert Grasse as Old Shatterhand
 Henry Hübchen as Winnetou
 Dieter Wien as Cornel Brinkley
 Victor Deiß as Hobble-Frank
 Hans-Jürgen Hanisch as Tante Droll
 Klaus Manchen as Großer Bär
 Reinhard Michalke as Sheriff

Production
Günter Rätz wrote the screenplay after Karl May's novel The Treasure of Silver Lake, originally published 1890–1891. In the novel, the main character is Old Firehand and not Old Shatterhand. The film was made with puppets and stop motion animation. It was produced by DEFA Studio für Animationsfilm in Dresden. Production began in 1985 and ended in 1989.

References

External links

 The Trace Leads to the Silver Lake at karl-may-filme.de 

1990 animated films
1990 films
1990s Western (genre) comedy films
Animated films based on novels
East German films
Winnetou films
German animated films
German children's films
German Western (genre) comedy films
1990s German-language films
Ostern films
1990s stop-motion animated films
Western (genre) animated films
1990s German films